Jerry Regier is the Deputy Assistant Secretary for Human Services Policy in the U.S. Department of Health and Human Services . He provides leadership on policy analysis and development in human services and on research under the Assistant Secretary for Planning and Evaluation (ASPE) for Secretary Mike Leavitt.

Education
Jerry Regier graduated from Grace University in Omaha, Nebraska. He then graduated from Michigan State University with a B.A. degree in history. His post-graduate work includes a master's degree in Biblical Studies from the International School of Theology, Master's of Public Administration from Harvard University, and an honorary Doctor of Divinity from Grace University.

Career

Family Research Council
In 1981, he established the Family Research Council, an independent public policy research and educational organization and served as President and CEO for four years.

Federal government appointments
He served in a variety of positions in federal government. He was the Acting Administrator of the National Office of Juvenile Justice and Delinquency Prevention (OJJDP) in the U.S. Department of Justice. President Bush nominated him to this Senate confirmation position. Prior to that position, he served in the Bush Administration as Acting Director of the Bureau of Justice Assistance (BJA) for three years. He was instrumental in assisting the United States Attorney General to design and implement the "Weed & Seed" Initiative which is now in over 300 communities throughout the United States. He also was an appointee in the Reagan administration as Associate Commissioner for the Administration of Children, Youth and Families in the U.S. Department of Health and Human Services.
The President of the United States also appointed him to the National Commission on Children (1988–93).

State government appointments
He served for five years as Secretary of Health & Human Services for Oklahoma Governor Frank Keating until he resigned on January 15, 2002 to run for Governor of Oklahoma. As Secretary, he provided policy oversight to 13 Agencies. Concurrently, he served as Deputy Director of the Office for Juvenile Affairs. He also served as Acting Director of the State Health Department during a crisis in that agency.

Mr. Regier served as Secretary of the Florida Department of Children & Families (DCF), appointed by Governor Jeb Bush in August, 2002. As Secretary he oversaw a Department of over 25,000 employees and the programs of Child Welfare, Mental Health, Developmental Disabilities, Economic Self Sufficiency, Child Care, and Refugee Services.

Recognition

In 2001 he was named the Administrator of the Year in Oklahoma by the American Society of Public Administration (Oklahoma Chapter).

Personal life
Jerry and his wife Sharyn have four children and five grandchildren.

References

Living people
State cabinet secretaries of Oklahoma
State cabinet secretaries of Florida
1945 births
Oklahoma Republicans
Leaders of Christian parachurch organizations
Reagan administration personnel
George H. W. Bush administration personnel
Heads of Oklahoma state agencies
Harvard Kennedy School alumni
Michigan State University alumni
Florida Republicans